La Serre-Bussière-Vieille is a commune in the Creuse department in the Nouvelle-Aquitaine region in central France.

Geography

The river Tardes forms most of the commune's western border.

Population

Sights
 The 14th-century church at La Serre.
 A dolmen, the "Pierre-sous-Pèze" at the hamlet of Planchat.
 Two châteaux, at Buxerolle and at Chaumont.

See also
Communes of the Creuse department

References

Communes of Creuse